Cascade High School is a public high school located in Clayton, Indiana. It serves grades 9-12 for the Mill Creek Community School Corporation.

History
Cascade High School was established in 1964 as a consolidation of Clayton, Amo, and Stilesville High Schools.

Demographics
21.4% of the students were eligible for free or reduced-cost lunch. For 2017–18, Cascade was a Title I school.

Athletics

The Cascade Cadets compete in the Indiana Crossroads Conference. School colors are Columbia blue and black. For 2019–20, the following Indiana High School Athletic Association (IHSAA) sanctioned sports were offered:

Baseball
Basketball
Cross country
Football
Golf
Soccer
Softball
Swimming and diving
Track and field
Volleyball
Wrestling

See also
 List of high schools in Indiana

References

External links

Educational institutions established in 1964
Public high schools in Indiana
Schools in Hendricks County, Indiana
1964 establishments in Indiana